Blitz Games Studios Limited was a British video game developer based in Leamington Spa. Founded in 1990 by the Oliver Twins, who ran the company until its closure in 2013, it is best known for producing games such as The Fairly OddParents, Bratz, SpongeBob SquarePants, The Biggest Loser, and Karaoke Revolution.

Divisions

Blitz Games
Blitz Games created the games that the company first became well known for: family titles, often licensed on popular characters and existing intellectual property.

Blitz Arcade
Blitz Arcade was founded in 2006 with a team of 35 people. It was focused on developing downloadable titles of a small scope. Its first release was an advergame series created for the US Burger King chain. After that, Blitz Arcade turned its focus to downloadable titles and had success with its first game of this type: SpongeBob SquarePants: Underpants Slam. They also developed shooter PowerUp Forever, puzzler Droplitz and the 3DTV-compatible beat 'em up Invincible Tiger: The Legend of Han Tao.

Volatile Games
Volatile Games was responsible for the company's mature games. The division dates from 2006. The company and the division ended in 2013.

Video games created by this division include Reservoir Dogs, runner-up in the 2006 BAFTA awards for Best Soundtrack. Despite allowing the player to complete the game without firing a single shot, the game was considered so realistic in its depictions of violence that it was banned in Australia. They released Dead to Rights: Retribution on 27 April 2010.

A proposed game, Possession, was cancelled.

TruSim
TruSim was the serious games division. The idea was to bring commitment to training through video games. It is best known for its work on medical-related training programs including the award-winning Interactive Trauma Trainer.

BlitzTech
BlitzTech created and licensed the game development engine and toolchain.

Earlier divisions

Virtual Experience Company
Past projects include the Tintern Abbey virtual tour. The company was acquired by Blitz Games at the end of 2006 but was sold back to former owner Mike Gogan in May 2008.

Blitz 1UP
In 2008 Blitz Games Studios launched the Blitz1UP programme to help independent developers bring their games to market.
The programme provided free help and advice on all aspects of game production as well as crowd sourced QA.
The programme was closed in 2011 and was replaced by IndieCity, an online indie game marketplace.

Games 
Games created or published by Interactive Studios/Blitz Games Studios include:

Awards 
2007
 Nickelodeon Kids' Choice Awards 2007 - Favourite Videogame – SpongeBob SquarePants: Creature from the Krusty Krab
 Edge award for Training and Development of young people
 ICT Excellence in Skills
 Blitz Games wins Develop Industry Excellence Award for Business Development
 Cannes Titanium Grand Prix Award for the Burger King games
 Golden Clio Award for Burger King games

2006
 Blitz Games CEO Philip Oliver named Best Industry Player by TIGA 
 Warwickshire Employer of Choice Awards 2006 for creating an exceptional working environment .

Closure
On 12 September 2013, the company announced that it was closing after 23 years of business. The closure came as a result of the company struggling to raise money to support future development projects, with the demise of THQ, a major client, said by Philip Oliver to have hit the company particularly hard. The company is reported to have owed £2.2 million to staff and creditors.

The Oliver brothers along with the former company's COO Richard Smithies almost immediately formed a new company, Radiant Worlds, in the same town, and were reported to have recruited up to 50 former Blitz staff.

References

External links 
 Official website
 

British companies established in 1990
Companies based in Leamington Spa
Defunct companies of England
Defunct video game companies of the United Kingdom
Video game companies disestablished in 2013
Video game companies established in 1990
Video game development companies